McAllister may refer to:

People
 McAllister (surname)
 Clan MacAlister, Highland Scottish Clan and a branch of Clan Donald
 Justice McAllister (disambiguation)

Places
 McAllister, Montana
 McAllister, Wisconsin
 Fort McAllister
 Fort McAllister Historic State Park

Others
 Moving McAllister, film